Ülemiste railway station is a railway station in the Ülemiste sub-district of Tallinn, the capital city of Estonia. It is located approximately 500 metres from Tallinn Airport, to which it has been connected by a tramline since 2017.

The station is served by the trains of the Estonian government-owned passenger train operator, Elron. Express trains from Tallinn Baltic Station stop at Ülemiste on the way to Tartu and Narva, and there is a commuter service to stations on the line to Aegviidu.

Rail Baltica
Ülemiste station will be the location of Rail Baltica's Tallinn terminus, which is planned to open in 2030. High-speed trains on Rail Baltica will connect the three Baltic capitals to Poland using the new standard-gauge railway. An international competition was held to find a design for the new terminal with "Light Stream" by Zaha Hadid Architects being declared as the winner.

See also
 List of railway stations in Estonia
 Rail transport in Estonia
 Pärnu railway station

References

External links

 Official website of Eesti Raudtee (EVR) – the national railway infrastructure company of Estonia  responsible for most of the Estonian railway network
 Official website of Elron – the national passenger train operating company of Estonia operating all domestic passenger train services
 ERR News: Rail Baltica announces terminal building architecture competition.
 Architects' Journal: ZHA wins contest for Rail Baltica terminal in Tallinn.
 Rail Baltic Estonia: ''RAIL BALTICA ÜLEMISTE JOINT TERMINAL.

Railway stations in Estonia
Transport in Tallinn

